The Lucknow Pact was an agreement reached between the Indian National Congress and the Muslim League (AIML) at a joint session of both the parties held in Lucknow in December 1916. Through the pact, the two parties agreed to allow representation to religious minorities in the provincial legislatures. The Muslim League leaders agreed to join the Congress movement demanding Indian autonomy. Scholars cite this as an example of a consociational practice in Indian politics. Bal Gangadhar Tilak represented the Congress while framing the deal, and Muhammad Ali Jinnah (who joined the Muslim League in 1913) participated in this event.

Background 
The British had announced under immense pressure from Indian masses, in order to satisfy the Indians, that they will be considering a series of proposal that would lead to at least half of the members of the Executive Council being elected and the Legislative Council having a majority of elected members needed. Both the Congress and the Muslim League supported these. Both had realized that for further concessions to be gained, greater cooperation was required.

Agreements by the Congress 
The Congress agreed to separate electorates for Muslims in electing representatives to the Imperial and Provincial Legislative Councils. Although the Muslims were given this right in the Indian Council Act of 1909, the Indian National Congress opposed it. The Congress also agreed to the idea of one-third seats for the Muslims in the Councils despite the fact that the Muslim population represented less than a third. Apart from that, the Congress agreed that no act affecting a community should be passed unless three-quarters of that community's members on the council supported it. After the signing of this pact the rivalry between moderates and extremists was reduced to some extent. There was a significant change in their relation.

Demands presented to the British 
Both parties presented some common demands to the British. They demanded:
 The number of elected seats on the councils should be increased.
 Laws/Motions which were passed by large majorities in the councils should be accepted as bindings by the British Government.
 Minorities in the provinces should be protected.
 All provinces should be granted autonomy.
 Separating the executive from the judiciary
 At least half of the members of the Executive Council being elected, the Legislative council having a majority of elected members

Importance 
The Lucknow Pact was seen as a beacon of hope to Hindu–Muslim unity. It was the first time that the Hindus and Muslims had made a joint demand for political reform to the British. It led to a growing belief in British India that Home Rule (self-government) was a real possibility. The pact also marked the high-water mark of Hindu-Muslim unity. It established cordial relations between the Muslim League and the Indian National Congress. Before the pact, both parties were viewed as rivals who opposed each other and worked in their own interests. However, the pact brought a change in that view.

The Lucknow Pact also helped in establishing cordial relations between the two prominent groups within the Indian National Congress – the 'extremist' faction led by the Lal Bal Pal trio (Lala Lajpat Rai, Bal Gangadhar Tilak and Bipin Chandra Pal), and the 'moderate' faction led by Gopal Krishna Gokhale until his death in 1915 and later represented by Gandhi. Though Jinnah advocated a separate nation for the Muslims 20 years later, in 1916 he was a member of both Congress and Muslim League, was an associate of Tilak, and hailed as 'ambassador of Hindu-Muslim Unity’.

See also 
Poona Pact
Reservation in India

References

Indian independence movement
Pakistan Movement
1916 documents